Context-free may refer to:

 Context-free grammar
 Deterministic context-free grammar
 Generalized context-free grammar
 Probabilistic context-free grammar
 Synchronous context-free grammar
 Context-free language
 Deterministic context-free language

See also 
 
 Context (disambiguation)
 Free (disambiguation)
 Quoting out of context